First MicroFinance Bank-Tajikistan (FMFB-T) is a commercial bank of the Aga Khan Development Network involved in microfinancing operations. The Bank was established in 2003, and has its head office at Dushanbe.

The First MicroFinanceBank provides a comprehensive range of financial services to small and medium enterprises (SME) and microfinance customers to help the development of its customers and the economy – by increasing access to affordable credit, improving savings products and providing efficient and cost-effective remittance services.

See also 
 First MicroFinance Bank-Afghanistan
 First MicroFinance Bank-Pakistan

References

External links 
 

Banks of Tajikistan
Aga Khan Development Network
Microfinance companies of Asia
Microfinance banks
Banks established in 2003
2003 establishments in Tajikistan